"Trust in Me (The Python's Song)" is a song in the popular Walt Disney film The Jungle Book, from 1967. The song was sung by Sterling Holloway playing the part of Kaa, the snake. The song was written by Disney staff songwriters Robert and Richard Sherman. In the song, Kaa quickly hypnotizes Mowgli into a calm, soothing, relaxing trance, sending Mowgli walking along his body until he finally coils himself around Mowgli just like he did before. As the song concludes, Kaa readies himself to devour the boy, only to be stopped by Shere Khan the tiger in his search for Mowgli.

Composition
The Shermans were brought onto the film by Walt Disney, who felt that the film in keeping with Rudyard Kipling's book was too dark for family viewing.  In a deliberate effort to keep the score light, this song as well as the Sherman Brothers' other contributions to the score generally concern darker subject matter than the accompanying music would suggest. "Trust in Me" originated from Disney's suggestion to add a song to Kaa's sequence, and was written by the Shermans based on "The Land of Sand", a song they had composed for 1964's Mary Poppins that ended up not being used. Kaa speaks and sings with a subtle, lilting lisp, giving the song a humorous dimension that it would not otherwise have.

Appearances and cover versions
The song appeared in several other media:
In the pilot episode of Jungle Cubs—a prequel to the Disney film looking at the animals' lives when they were childhood friends—as Baloo sings about how the animals should enjoy their childhood, Kaa references this song when he starts to hypnotise Louie, as he sings "I'll learn to use these baby blues, Just put your trust in me".
In Mickey's House of Villains, during the "It's Our House Now" musical number, Minnie is tossed to Kaa, who sings two lines from "Trust in Me" to her.
Part of the song is on the soundtrack of the HalloWishes fireworks show, mixed with "AEIOU", song by the Caterpillar of Alice in Wonderland as part of Mickey's Not-So-Scary Halloween Party at the Magic Kingdom in the Walt Disney World resort.
The 2016 live-action adaptation of The Jungle Book features a version sung by Scarlett Johansson. who plays Kaa in the film.
In Series 22 Episode 3 of Top Gear, Jeremy Clarkson makes a brief humorous reference to the song during a sequence in which he comes face to face with a mannequin's genitals.
In an episode of Not Going Out, Daisy tells Lee that Lucy is falling under the spell of her old boyfriend Scott, like Kaa hypnotizing Mowgli. She imitates Kaa singing "Trust in me", though Lee thinks she's acting like Hannibal Lecter.

The following artists released cover versions of the song:
Siouxsie and the Banshees performed the song on their 1987 cover album LP, Through the Looking Glass. Sounds praised this non-traditional version as "quite astonishing. Whereas once it was about a python getting ready to crush a little boy to death, now it's a harp-laden lullaby of rampant, swirling eroticism".
The Holly Cole Trio covered "Trust in Me" on the 1991 release Blame It on My Youth.
American alternative rock band Belly covered "Trust In Me" on their 1993 EP "Feed The Tree".
Susheela Raman covered "Trust in Me" on her debut album, Salt Rain, in 2001.
The Dead Brothers performed a dark, psychedelic and bluesy version on their 2006 album Wunderkammer.
Selena Gomez performed the song in 2010 for the album DisneyMania 7.
That Handsome Devil included the song in their 2012 re-interpretation of the Jungle Book songs.

References

1967 songs
1987 singles
2010 singles
Songs written by the Sherman Brothers
Songs from The Jungle Book (1967 film)
Siouxsie and the Banshees songs
Selena Gomez songs
Scarlett Johansson songs